Xylomelum cunninghamianum is a species of flowering plant in the family Proteaceae and is endemic to eastern Australia. It is a shrub or small tree with narrow elliptic to lance-shaped leaves with toothed edges when young, groups of flowers covered with brownish hairs and oval fruit densely covered with velvety rust-coloured to grey hair.

Description

This species differs from X. pyriforme by its more robust habit, and larger leaves, flowers and fruits.

Taxonomy
Xylomelum cunninghamianum was first formally described in 1987 by Donald Bruce Foreman in the journal Muelleria from specimens he collected near Wallangra in 1985. The specific epithet (cunninghamianum) honours Allan Cunningham.

Distribution and habitat
Xylomelum cunninghamianum grows in forest and woodland in sandy soil and is found in scattered population from the Blackdown Tableland National Park in inland south-eastern Queensland to the Coolatai-Wallangra area in north-eastern New South Wales.

References

cunninghamianum
Proteales of Australia
Trees of Australia
Flora of Queensland
Flora of New South Wales
Plants described in 1987